The 1989 Soviet census, conducted between 12 and 19 January of that year, was the last one that took place in the Soviet Union. The census found the total population to be 286,730,819 inhabitants. In 1989, the Soviet Union ranked as the third most populous in the world, above the United States (with 248,709,873 inhabitants according to the 1990 census), although it was well below China and India.

Statistics
In 1989, about half of the Soviet Union's total population lived in the Russian SFSR, and approximately one-sixth (18%) of them in the Ukrainian SSR. Almost two-thirds (65.7%) of the population was urban, leaving the rural population with 34.3%. In this way, its gradual increase continued, as shown by the series represented by 47.9%, 56.3% and 62.3% of 1959, 1970 and 1979, respectively.

The last two national censuses (held in 1979 and 1989) showed that the country had been experiencing an average annual increase of about 2.5 million people, although it was a slight decrease from a figure of around 3 million per year in the previous intercensal period, 1959–1970. This post-war increase had contributed to the USSR's partial demographic recovery from the significant population loss that the USSR had suffered during the Great Patriotic War (the Eastern Front of World War II), and before it, during Stalin's Great Purge of 1936–1938. The previous postwar censuses, conducted in 1959, 1970 and 1979, had enumerated 208,826,650, 241,720,134, and 262,436,227 inhabitants, respectively.

In 1990, the Soviet Union was more populated than both the United States and Canada together, having some 40 million more inhabitants than the U.S. alone. However, after the dissolution of the Soviet Union in late 1991, the combined population of the 15 former Soviet republics stagnated at around 290 million inhabitants for the period 1995–2000. 

This significant slowdown may in part be due to the remarkable socio-economic changes that followed the dissolution, that have tended to reduce even more the already decreasing birth rates (which were already showing some signs of decline since the Soviet era, in particular among the people living in the European part of the Soviet Union, beginning from 1988-89). 

Regarding the situation today, the population of the 15 Soviet republics is around to 299 million, with much of this growth attributed to the Central Asian states, which have increasing fertility, and in a smaller part Azerbaijan and Russia. Estonia, Belarus, Armenia and Georgia have also recorded some positive growth in the recent years. Ukraine, Moldova, Latvia and Lithuania are in continuous decline in population since early 1990s, although Ukraine's decline seemed to stabilise in early 2010s, before the Ukrainian crisis. Since 2019 Lithuania seems to appear some first signs of stabilisation around 2.8 million.

Ranking of Soviet republics

Ethnicities of the Soviet Union

See also
Demographics of the Soviet Union
Republics of the Soviet Union
Soviet Census (1926)
Soviet Census (1937)
Soviet Census (1959)
Soviet Census (1970)
Soviet Census (1979)
Soviet Union

References

Further reading
Barbara A. Anderson and Brian D. Silver, "Growth and diversity of the population of the Soviet Union", The Annals of the American Academy of Political and Social Science , Vol. 510, No. 1, 155–177, 1990.
Ralph S. Clem, Ed., Research Guide to Russian and Soviet Censuses, Ithaca: Cornell University Press, 1986.
John C. Dewdney, "Population change in the Soviet Union, 1979-1989," Geography, Vol. 75, Pt. 3, No. 328, July 1990, 273–277.

External links
Subjects of Russia, on the www.statoids.com website (it includes the demographic evolution of the Soviet Union's population).

Census
Censuses in the Soviet Union
January 1989 events in Europe
Soviet Union